The Finswimming World Championships is the peak international event for the underwater sport of finswimming. These are conducted on behalf of the sport's governing body, Confédération Mondiale des Activités Subaquatiques (CMAS) by an affiliated national federation.

Scheduling
The championship is split into two events on the basis of age for both male and female swimmers - seniors (i.e. 18 years and older) and juniors (i.e. 12 to 17 years old).  The senior championship was first held in 1976 while the junior championship was first held in 1989. 
From 1976 to 1990, the senior championships were held every four years, except for the championship held in Moscow during 1982, and from 1990 to 2006 it was held every two years.  The junior championship has been held every two years from 1993, with the exception of the years 2005 and 2006.
As of 2007, the championships have been held every two years, with the senior age group event being held in the odd years starting with 2007, while the junior age group event is held in even years starting with 2008.

Organization
A world championship is conducted at two sites within a geographical locality - one being an olympic-size swimming pool (also known as a long course pool) and the other being an open water site suitable for long-distance finswimming.

The pool competition is carried out over five days with qualifying heats held in the morning and finals held in the afternoon.  Races are conducted in the following techniques and distances for both male and female swimmers:
Surface finswimming (SF) - individual races for distances of 50m, 100m, 200m, 400m, 800m and 1500m, and relays for 4 × 100 m, 4 × 200 m and 4×50 (mixed).
Bi-Fins (BF, also known as ‘Stereo-fins’) - 50m, 100m, 200m and 400m, and relays for 4×100 (mixed).
Apnoea finswimming (AP also known as ‘apnea’) - 50m while juniors younger than 14 years old swim only 25m.
Immersion finswimming (IM) - 100m and 400m.
As of 2014, the long-distance competition is held over one day for senior and juniors swimmers with the following schedule: Morning - 4 x 2 km mixed team relay (2 men and 2 women) and Afternoon - 6 km individual swim.  National federations may register a maximum of one relay team and a maximum of four individuals for the 6 km race.  Long distance swimming is only open to SF and BF techniques.

Championships 
In 1988 to 2005, World Championship in Long Distance Fins (LFD) was also held (World Championships in Long Distance Fins). Since 2006 competitions at all distances have been held at a single world championship.

Seniors (+18) 
Since 1976 (Open Waters events 2016 - 2018):

LFD (Seniors and Juniors)

Juniors (12 - 17) 
Since 1989 (Open Waters events 2014 - 2019):

Masters (30 - Over 75) (Pool and Open Waters)

Open Water (Juniors, Seniors, Masters)

See also 
 Finswimming World Championship
 Finswimming World Championship in LFD

Notes

References

External links
 CMAS Finswimming Championship Archive

 
Finswimming
Finswimming competitions